Destinikon, rendered in Serbian as Dostinik or Dostinika (Достиника), was one of eight inhabited cities (καστρα/kastra) of "baptized Serbia" (the hinterland of the Serbian Principality), mentioned in De Administrando Imperio (950s, abbr. DAI). 

The DAI mentions Destinikon as the first among the enumerated cities ("Destinikon, Tzernabouskeï, Megyretous, Dresneïk, Lesnik, Salines, Katera, Desnik") of "baptized Serbia". In chapter 32, the DAI tells of Klonimir, an exiled dynastical member in Bulgaria, who marched an army into Serbia, entering the city of Destinikon with the intent of seizing the throne, but was defeated by Prince Petar, in ca. 896.

Studies
 According to Florin Curta (2006), based on the events described, the forts were in what is today central-eastern Bosnia.
P. Petrović and P. Vlahović (1984) concluded that it was most likely southeast of Ras. This presumption is confirmed by the fact that the DAI mentions Klonimir attacking Petar, coming from Bulgaria.
R. Novaković (1981), studying fort ruins in the area of the early medieval Serbian state believed Ždrelo or Gradište Gedže, in Orahovac, to have been the site. The site, ruins of a fortified city with towers, is located at a hill called Gradiš or Gradeš, dated to the 9th–10th centuries.
Metohija
Aleksandar Deroko noted that it may have been early Sjenica.
Croatian linguist P. Skok (1881–1956) and Serbian historian V. Korać (1924–2010) believed it to be Drsnik, in Metohija.
Serbian historian S. Novaković (1842–1915) and K. Grot believed it to be Deževa, in Raška.
Slovak historian P. J. Šafárik (1795–1861) believed it to be on the Lower Drina, near the villages of Disit and Desna.
Czech historian K. J. Jireček (1854–1918) believed it to have been located west of Ras. This view was supported by Serbian historian S. Stanojević (1874–1937).
Serbian historian M. Blagojević (1930–2012) believed it to have been in the župa (county) of Hvosno.
Serbian historian S. Ćirković (1929–2009) presumed it was on the road "from Ras towards the Lim valley".
Serbian historian Vladimir Ćorović deemed the location unknown.
Remains of a fortification thought to be that of Destinikon have been found in the Archaeological site of Vrsjenice, near Sjenica. The findings date from late antiquity and early Byzantine.

References

Sources

  
 
 
 
 
 
 

Former populated places in the Balkans
Lost cities and towns
9th century in Serbia
10th century in Serbia
Principality of Serbia (early medieval)